Dhakuria Union is a Union Parishad under Manirampur Upazila of Jessore District in the division of Khulna, Bangladesh. It has an area of 14.70 square kilometres and a population of 23,906.

See also 
 Gabukhali

References

Unions of Manirampur Upazila
Unions of Jessore District
Unions of Khulna Division